The Indian city of Bengaluru has four taluks in Bangalore Urban district in Karnataka:

Hebbala(Bengaluru North)
Yelahanka
Kengeri(Bengaluru South)
Krishnarajapura(Bengaluru East)
Anekal

References

Geography of Bangalore
Taluks of Karnataka